Tom Okker and Marty Riessen were the defending champions but did not compete that year.

Brian Gottfried and Raúl Ramírez won the doubles title in the final of the 1977 Paris Open tennis tournament 6–2, 6–0 against Jeff Borowiak and Roger Taylor.

Seeds
Champion seeds are indicated in bold text while text in italics indicates the round in which those seeds were eliminated.

 Brian Gottfried /  Raúl Ramírez (champions)
 Robert Lutz /  Raymond Moore (quarterfinals)
 Byron Bertram /  Bernard Mitton (semifinals)
 Patrice Dominguez /  Jean-Louis Haillet (first round)

Draw

External links
 1977 Paris Open Doubles draw

Doubles